Southwick is an electoral division of West Sussex in the United Kingdom, and returns one member to sit on West Sussex County Council.

Extent
The division covers the town of Southwick, including the neighbourhood of Fishersgate.

It comprises the following Adur district wards: Eastbrook Ward, Hillside Ward and the eastern part of Southwick Green Ward. It falls entirely within the un-parished area of Shoreham-by-Sea.

2013 Election
Results of the election held on 2 May 2013:

2013 Election
Results of the election held on 4 June 2009:

2006 Bye-election
Results of the bye-election held on 14 September 2006:

2005 Election
Results of the election held on 5 May 2005:

References
Election Results - West Sussex County Council

External links
 West Sussex County Council
 Election Maps

Electoral Divisions of West Sussex